The canton of Montrouge is a French administrative division, located in the arrondissement of Antony, in the Hauts-de-Seine département (Île-de-France région). Its borders were modified at the French canton reorganisation which came into effect in March 2015. Its seat is in Montrouge.

Composition 
The canton consists of the following communes:
 Malakoff
 Montrouge

Adjacent cantons 
 Canton of Clamart (west)
 Canton of Châtillon (south)
 Canton of Bagneux (south)

See also
Cantons of the Hauts-de-Seine department
Communes of the Hauts-de-Seine department

References

Montrouge